The Aeronomy of Ice in the Mesosphere (AIM or Explorer 90) is a NASA satellite launched in 2007 to conduct a planned 26-month study of noctilucent clouds (NLCs). It is the ninetieth Explorer program mission and is part of the NASA-funded Small Explorer program (SMEX). It went silent after 15 years in 2023.

Mission 

The overall goal is to resolve why PMCs form and why they vary. AIM expected lifetime was at least two years. AIM measures PMCs and the thermal, chemical and dynamical environment in which they form. This will allow the connection to be made between these clouds and the meteorology of the polar mesospheric summer echoes. This connection is important because a significant variability in the yearly number of noctilucent ("glow in the dark") clouds (NLCs), one manifestation of PMCs, has been suggested as an indicator of global change. The body of data collected by AIM will provide the basis for a rigorous study of PMCs that can be reliably used to study past PMC changes, present trends and their relationship to global change. In the end, AIM will provide an expanded basis for the study of long-term variability in the climate of Earth. The AIM scientific objectives will be achieved by measuring near simultaneous PMC abundances, PMC spatial distributions, cloud particle size distributions, gravity wave activity, cosmic dust influx to the atmosphere needed to study the role of these particles as nucleation sites and precise, vertical profile measurements of temperature, OH, NO, and aerosols. AIM carries three instruments: an infrared solar occultation differential absorption radiometer, built by the Space Dynamics Laboratory, Utah State University (Solar Occultation for Ice Experiment - SOFIE); a panoramic ultraviolet imager (Cloud Imaging and particle Size Experiment - CIPS); and, an in situ dust detector (Cosmic Dust Experiment - CDE), both designed and built by the Laboratory for Atmospheric and Space Physics, University of Colorado. Ball Aerospace & Technologies Corporation constructed the spacecraft bus and GATS, Inc., Newport News, Virginia, led the data management effort.

First seen in 1885, two years after the powerful eruption of the Indonesian volcano Krakatoa, scientists originally thought PMC's formed from the plumes of ash propelled into the sky during that eruption. But the clouds have persisted long after the effects of Krakatoa were felt. These days, some scientists think they are caused by space dust, while others believe that modern-day PMC's are indicators of changing climate of Earth. One thing is for certain: PMC's are shaped by the meteorology of the mesosphere, which does appear to be changing.

Spacecraft 

Instruments

Launch 
On 25 April 2007, AIM was launched into a circular  Sun-synchronous orbit by a Pegasus-XL launch vehicle, which was air-launched from the Lockheed L-1011 Stargazer aircraft operated by Orbital Sciences Corporation (OSC).

See also 

 Aeronomy
 Explorer program

References

External links 
 AIM home
 SOFIE Instrument and science description, view or download data
 AIM Mission Profile by NASA
 Taking AIM at Night-Shining Clouds: 10 Years, 10 Science Highlights

Earth observation satellites of the United States
NASA satellites
NASA satellites orbiting Earth
Spacecraft launched in 2007
Explorers Program
Spacecraft launched by Pegasus rockets
Geospace monitoring satellites